Anders Järryd and Hans Simonsson became 3-time consecutive champions after defeating Jim Gurfein and Erick Iskersky 7–5, 6–3 in the final.

Seeds

Draw

Finals

Top half

Bottom half

References

External links
 Official results archive (ATP)
 Official results archive (ITF)

1983 Grand Prix (tennis)